Custards is an unincorporated community in Crawford County, Pennsylvania, United States. Custards is located on Pennsylvania Route 285, west of Cochranton and is near Interstate 79 and U.S. Route 19.

References

Unincorporated communities in Pennsylvania
Unincorporated communities in Crawford County, Pennsylvania